John C. D'Amico (born June 12, 1962) is an American politician who served as a Democratic member of the Illinois House of Representatives, representing the 15th District from November 2004 to November 2021.

Education and career
He graduated from St. Edward Elementary School and Weber High School in Chicago, then attended Northeastern Illinois University.

D'Amico joined the Chicago Department of Water in 1982 and now serves as a district foreman for the Chicago Water Department.

Illinois House of Representatives
In the 2004 general election, D'Amico was elected to the Illinois House of Representatives from the 15th district. After the election, 15th district Democratic incumbent Ralph Capparelli (who lost re-election in the 20th district) resigned effective November 4, 2004. The Democratic Representative Committee of the 15th Representative District appointed D'Amico to fill the vacancy for the remainder of the 93rd General Assembly. D'Amico was sworn into office November 6, 2004. He represented the 15th District, and served on several committees: 
Aging
Appropriations-Public Safety
Labor
Elections & Campaign Reform (Vice-Chairperson)
Electric Utility Oversight
Transportation & Motor Vehicles
Workers' Compensation and Unemployment
Committee of the Whole

He is a member of the Edgebrook Community Association, St. Edwards Athletic Advisory Committee, City Club of Chicago, Mayfair Lions Club, Queen of All Saints Men's Club and the Edgebrook Sauganash Athletic Association. He stepped down as a state legislator on November 5, 2021.

Personal life
D'Amico and his wife Christine have three children. His aunt is former Alderman Margaret Laurino of Chicago's 39th Ward.

Electoral history

References

External links
Representative John D'Amico (D) 15th District at the Illinois General Assembly
By session: 101st,100th, 99th, 98th, 97th, 96th, 95th, 94th, 93rd
 
John C. D'Amico at Illinois House Democrats

Democratic Party members of the Illinois House of Representatives
1962 births
Living people
Politicians from Chicago
Northeastern Illinois University alumni
21st-century American politicians